The 2019 Montreal Alouettes season was the 53rd season for the team in the Canadian Football League and their 65th overall. The Alouettes finished with a 10–8 record and qualified for the playoffs for the first time since 2014 following a week 17 win over the Calgary Stampeders on October 5, 2019. The club hosted a playoff game for the first time since 2014, having finished in second place in the East Division. However, they lost the game to the Edmonton Eskimos by a score of 37–29.

The team's head coach, Mike Sherman, abruptly departed June 8, 2019, after the team had played its first two preseason games. Khari Jones became the team's interim head coach and this was the third season under general manager, Kavis Reed. Shortly after their fourth game of the season, Reed was dismissed by the Alouettes on July 14, 2019 by team president and CEO Patrick Boivin. His position is being filled by Assistant General Manager of Player Personnel, Joe Mack, with other duties shared by Jones and Director of Football Operations, Patrick Donovan. 

The Alouettes entered the 2019 CFL season with significantly different home and away uniforms for the first time since the 2000 season. The club also announced a change in stadium seating with gameday capacity at Percival Molson Memorial Stadium being "strategically lower(ed)" from 23,430 to 20,025 seats (the same capacity it had before the stadium was expanded to accommodate the CFL, which normally requires stadiums to have at least 24,000 seats) and average ticket prices being reduced from $84 to $75.

Offseason

Banishment of Johnny Manziel 
On February 27, 2019, Johnny Manziel, a quarterback for the Alouettes in 2018, was permanently banned from playing on any CFL team as a result of what the Alouettes called an unspecified "(contravention of) the agreement which made him eligible to play." Manziel denied any wrongdoing but accepted the banishment, stating he would consider playing options in the United States such as the Alliance of American Football or the XFL.

Bob Wetenhall relinquishes ownership 
On May 31, 2019, Robert C. Wetenhall, the owner of the Alouettes for most of the time since the team relocated from Baltimore in the late 1990s, surrendered control of the Alouettes franchise to the Canadian Football League, which will attempt to sell the franchise to a new owner. Two ownership groups have publicly expressed interest in buying the team: Eric Lapointe, a former Alouettes running back; and Clifford Starke, a 35-year-old medical cannabis entrepreneur. Lapointe had previously made an offer to Wetenhall in 2017 but had been rebuffed; Lapointe acknowledged that Wetenhall was reluctant to sell the team to him. Lapointe withdrew from bidding in April 2019. Vincent Guzzo met with the CFL in mid-May to submit a purchase bid.

Foreign drafts
For the first time in its history, the CFL held drafts for foreign players from Mexico and Europe. Like all other CFL teams, the Alouettes held three non-tradeable selections in the 2019 CFL–LFA Draft, which took place on January 14, 2019. The 2019 European CFL Draft took place on April 11, 2019 where all teams held one non-tradeable pick.

CFL draft
The 2019 CFL Draft took place on May 2, 2019. The Alouettes selected second in each round of the draft, less any traded and forfeited picks, by virtue of finishing second-last in the league standings. The club forfeited their first-round selection after selecting Tyler Johnstone in the 2018 Supplemental Draft. They also traded away their second-round pick to Hamilton as part of the Ryan Bomben and Jamal Robinson trade. The Alouettes upgraded their scheduled third-round pick to a second-round pick by trading Tyrell Sutton to the BC Lions and acquired another second-round pick by trading Chris Ackie to the Ottawa Redblacks. The Alouettes re-acquired a third-round selection by trading Vernon Adams to the Saskatchewan Roughriders (who eventually re-joined the Alouettes as a free agent in 2018).

Preseason

Schedule 

 Games played with white uniforms.

Regular season

Standings

Schedule
In the late evening of August 9 at 9:06 pm EDT, a weather delay was declared at Percival Molson Memorial Stadium due to an approaching thunderstorm with intense lightning; the Roughriders were leading the Alouettes 17–10 with 2:41 left in the 3rd quarter. Because the game had not restarted by 10:06 pm EDT and over 7:30 had been played in the 3rd at that point, the game was decided to be official and the 17–10 score was declared final.

In week 11, the Alouettes were the "away" team as they played the Toronto Argonauts in the fourth regular season installment of Touchdown Atlantic in Moncton, New Brunswick.

 Games played with white uniforms.
 Games played with blue uniforms.

Post-season

Schedule 

 Games played with blue uniforms.

Team

Roster

Coaching staff

References

External links
 

Montreal Alouettes seasons
2019 Canadian Football League season by team
2010s in Montreal
2019 in Quebec